XOX Malaysia launched in 2005, XOX Berhad (previously known as XOX MOBILE) is a Malaysian technology corporation.

The company began as a telecommunication company and launched its first prepaid SIM card in 2009, and was the first Malaysian Mobile Virtual Network Operator (MNVO) to be listed on Bursa Malaysia in 2011. Currently their mobile services are marketed under ONEXOX brand and has approximately 2.5 million subscribers.

History

2009 – 2019: Launch, Expansions and Partnerships

Telecommunication
In January 2009, XOX launched its first prepaid SIM card. A Hybrid Plan (Prepaid + Postpaid) was later introduced in the second half of 2010. In 2012, XOX launched its SIM-FREE subscription plan which was followed by the #PrepaidPlus plan known as ‘XOX-Voopee’ in 2013. In April 2016, the plan was then discontinued and was replaced by ONEXOX Prepaid as part of the efforts to consolidate product divisions.

As An Official Mobile Technology Partner
In 2013, XOX was appointed by the Penang State Government Information Division as the official Mobile Technology Partner. A year later, the Badminton Association Malaysia (BAM) appointed XOX as its official Mobile Technology Partner.

The brand launched 'XOX-Voopee' SIM-FREE subscription plan in 2012 followed by the launching of #prepaidplus in 2013 which was then discontinued in April 2016 and replaced with ONEXOX prepaid as part of product consolidation. Appointed as official Mobile Technology partner for Penang State Government Information Division in 2013.

In 2014, XOX MOBILE was signed as the Official Mobile Technology Partner for Badminton Association Malaysia (BAM). The brand then launched "Season Pass" in the same year.

In February 2016, XOX Mobile signed badminton player Dato Lee Chong Wei as its ambassador. XOX partnered with Galaxy to bring in entertainment such as Hong Kong singer Eason Chan ‘Another Eason’s Life in Malaysia’ on 28 February 2016, South Korean singer Jung Ji-Hoon (known as Rain) ‘The Squall World Tour 2016’ on 21 May 2016, Hong Kong Cantopop singer Sammi Cheng ‘Touch Mi World Tour 2016’ on 26 & 27 May 2016 and ‘Hill雄群星汇’ on 18 June 2016. In April, XOX MOBILE announced its collaboration with Johor Southern Tigers (JST), and the brand launched a limited edition Southern Tigers Club Prepaid starter pack to keep fan clubs more updated on club happenings. Subsequently, XOX MOBILE has signed on as Main Sponsor of Petaling Badminton Club (PBC) and continues to support the development of new badminton talents.

2017-2019: Launch of products ONEXOX Black and XOX eSIM

From 2017 to 2019, XOX MOBILE developed and launched ONEXOX Black in 2018 and XOX eSIM in 2019. All new products include XOX MOBILE's feature called #BURNPROOF, whichautomatically carries forward unused data, minutes and SMS and no forfeiting.

In 2018, XOX MOBILE expanded its operation in Indonesia by having a joint venture agreement with Perkumpulan Nahdlatul Ulama (PBNU), EH Integrated Systems Sdn Bhd and PT Nusantara Digital Telekomunikasi. The new company known as PT Nusantara Mobile Telecommunication will focus on telecommunications and telecommunication services, mobile application services (Voopee) and e-wallet services in Indonesia.

In 2019, XOX MOBILE launched Malaysia's first fully digitized XOX eSIM, an embedded SIM technology.

Marketing and activities 

XOX FA Cup Final 2015

XOX MOBILE was title sponsor of the 2015 Football Association of Malaysia FA Cup.

2016 Olympic Reward #WiraMalaysia

In conjunction of Malaysian Olympic Medallist returning from Rio 2016 Olympics Game (Brazil), XOX MOBILE dedicated cash rewards to the Olympic Game Medalists and their Coaches as an appreciation for their effort and performance, totalling RM315,000.

2017 to 2019 Malaysian Cub Prix

XOX MOBILE is one of the main sponsor for Malaysian Cub Prix from 2017 until now. It is an effort to nurture young Malaysian talented riders to future world champions.

2019 ONEXOX TKKR SAG Team

In 2019, XOX MOBILE made a partnership with ONEXOX TKKR SAG Team, a Malaysian-Spanish motorcycle racing team who are competing in 4 events in 2019 which are Malaysian Cub Prix, FIM ARRC, FIM CEV Repsol and FIM Moto2.

Awards 
XOX MOBILE has won several awards including:
 The ‘BrandLaureate Master Class’s Award 2013 Emerging Telco of the Year’.
 The BrandLaureate President's Award 2016 Innovation for Mobile Network Operator – XOX MOBILE Season Pass.
Master Class Awards: Emerging Telco Of The Year
Best MVNO of the Year, Mobile Business Excellence Award 2018.
Best Package of Business, Mobile Business Excellence Award 2018.

References

Mobile virtual network operators
Telecommunications companies of Malaysia
Mobile phone companies of Malaysia
Companies established in 2005
2005 establishments in Malaysia
Companies listed on ACE Market